A total of 36 teams contested the league divided into three groups, Lohko A (Group A), Lohko B (Group B) and Lohko C (Group C). 25 returning from the 2019 season, two relegated from Ykkönen and nine promoted from Kolmonen. The top four of each group will qualify to promotion matches to decide which three teams get promoted to the Ykkönen. The bottom two teams in each group will get relegated to the Kolmonen. Each team will play a total of 22 matches, playing twice against each team of its group.

Tables

Lohko A (Group A)

Lohko B (Group B)

Lohko C (Group C)

Promotion groups
The top four teams from each group will progress to this stage and compete in a four-team competition to determine the three groups winners to gain promotion to the Ykkönen.

References

Kakkonen seasons
3
Fin
Fin